Horhoreh is a village in Kamal Rud Rural District, Qolqol Rud District, Tuyserkan County, Hamadan Province, Iran. At the 2006 census, its population was 40, in 9 families.

References 

Populated places in Tuyserkan County